Elter is a surname. Notable people with the surname include:

Anielka Elter (1901–1958), Czechoslovak actress
Anton Elter (1858–1925), German philologist
Leo Elter (1929–2008), American football running back
Margaret Elter (c. 1525 –c. 1553), German protestant
Peter Elter (born 1958), German tennis player
Robert Elter (1899–1991), Luxembourgian footballer

See also 
Elter Water, is a small lake in North West England